The Roman Catholic Diocese of Cachoeiro de Itapemirim is a diocese located in the city of Cachoeiro de Itapemirim in the Ecclesiastical province of Vitória in Brazil.

History
 16 February 1958: Established as Diocese of Cachoeiro de Itapemirim from the Diocese of Espírito Santo

Bishops
 Bishops of Cachoeiro de Itapemirim (Roman rite), in reverse chronological order
 Bishop Dario Campos, O.F.M. (2011.04.27 – 2018.11.07), appointed Archbishop of Vitória, Espirito Santo 
 Bishop Célio de Oliveira Goulart, O.F.M. (2003.07.09 – 2010.05.26), appointed Bishop of São João del Rei
 Bishop Luiz Mancilha Vilela, SS.CC. (1985.12.03 – 2002.12.03), appointed Coadjutor Archbishop of Vitória, Espirito Santo
 Bishop Luís Gonzaga Peluso (1959.07.25 – 1985.12.03)

Other priest of this diocese who became bishop
Juarez Delorto Secco, appointed Auxiliary Bishop of São Sebastião do Rio de Janeiro

References
 GCatholic.org
 Catholic Hierarchy
 Diocese website (Portuguese)

Roman Catholic dioceses in Brazil
Christian organizations established in 1958
Cachoeiro de Itapemirim, Roman Catholic Diocese of
Roman Catholic dioceses and prelatures established in the 20th century
1958 establishments in Brazil